Ella Kate Ewing (March 9, 1872 – January 10, 1913) was a Missouri woman considered the world's tallest female of her era. She would use her great height to earn a living as a sideshow attraction, popularly known as "The Missouri Giantess."

Early life and growth
Ella Ewing was born in La Grange, Missouri, the only child of Benjamin F. and Anna Eliza (Herring) Ewing. While a toddler, Ella's family moved to the small Scotland County community of Rainbow, southeast of Gorin, Missouri. She was of normal size while a baby and young child, with the first signs of any abnormality appearing shortly after her seventh birthday. At age fourteen she towered over not only other children, but her parents and other adults, measuring 6 feet 10 inches. The people of the Rainbow and Gorin area were used to her fast growth and met it with compassion; however, in 1885 Ewing learned that would not always be the case in the world at large. Asked to read the Declaration of Independence at a July 4 celebration in Wyaconda, Missouri, Ewing was met with shocked gasps, snickers and laughter when she stood to read. Led away in tears, the incident would have a profound effect on her life.

Ewing's maximum height is a matter of dispute, but in several accounts she was claimed to be over eight feet tall. Her mother's journal indicated that Ella's growth finally stopped when she was age twenty-two, at 8 feet, 4 inches tall. However, this is not well documented, and as such she is not mentioned in Guinness World Records. The Guinness Book of Records has stated she measured 7 feet 4 and a half inches tall, and may have reached 8 feet 3/4 inches by the time she died. As typical of many people afflicted with pituitary gigantism Ella's arms were very long, with her hands and feet exceptionally big. She wore a custom-made size 24 US shoe and often wore multiple rings on her fingers to mask their unusual length.

Professional life

Ewing initially disliked being gawked at, but decided that as it was unavoidable she might as well make some advantage to it, so agreed to make appearances and tours. Her Baptist faith, however, meant she would not make appearances on Sundays. For a time Ringling Bros. and Barnum & Bailey Circus introduced her as the Earth's tallest woman. Her professional career began at age twenty when Lewis Epstein, a museum owner and impresario from Chicago offered $1,000 for twenty-seven day appearance at his establishment. As part of her contract Ella's parents were allowed to accompany her and the family considered it something of a paid vacation, touring the sights of the Windy City when she was not on display at Epstein's museum. Not long after returning home to Gorin Lewis Epstein made an even bigger offer, a five-month engagement for the then-astounding sum of $5,000.  
Convincing her hesitant father that was more money than he could earn in five years of hardscrabble farming, Ella accepted and thus embarked permanently on a career as a museum and circus sideshow attraction. 
She died of tuberculosis and is buried at Harmony Grove Church near her hometown of Gorin.

In Scotland County, Missouri there is an "Ella Ewing Reservoir" for fishing and an arts festival in Memphis, Missouri was also named for her.

References

External links 
Site dedicated to Ella Ewing

People with gigantism
People from Scotland County, Missouri
Baptists from Missouri
1872 births
1913 deaths
People from La Grange, Missouri
19th-century Baptists